Henry Davis may refer to:

Arts and acting
Henry Davis (performer) (1886–1946), American Broadway singer and actor
Henry William Banks Davis (1833–1914), English painter

Sportspeople
Henry Davis (American football) (1942–2000), American football player
Henry Davis (baseball) (born 1999), American baseball player
Henry Davis (cricketer) (1803–1848), English cricketer
Harry Davis (footballer, born 1879) (Henry Davis, 1879–1945), English association football player who played for Sheffield Wednesday

Politicians
Henry Gassaway Davis (1823–1916), a U.S. senator from West Virginia and Democratic Vice Presidential candidate
Henry Winter Davis (1817–1865), U.S. Representative from Maryland and Radical Republican

Other
Henry Davis (cleric) (1771–1852), Christian cleric
Henry C. Davis (1845–1912), American businessman
Henry Gassett Davis (1807–1896), American orthopedic surgeon 
Henry Hague Davis (1885–1944), Canadian lawyer
Henry William Carless Davis (1874–1928), British historian

See also
Harry Davis (disambiguation)
Henry Davies (disambiguation)